Bruno Streckenbach (7 February 1902 – 28 October 1977) was a German SS functionary during the Nazi era. He was the head of Administration and Personnel Department of the Reich Security Main Office (RSHA). Streckenbach was responsible for many thousands of murders committed by Nazi mobile killing squads known as Einsatzgruppen.

Early Years 
Bruno Streckenbach was born in Hamburg, Germany on 7 February 1902. His highest education was Gymnasium, which he left in April 1918 to voluntarily report to the German Army during World War I.  Just like his close colleagues Erwin Schulz and Heinrich Himmler, he never served on the front lines of the battlefield due to the ceasefire that took place in November 1918.

After the end of the First World War, he was an active member of the Freikorps Bahrenfeld, which took part in the 1920 Kapp-Putsch. He was employed as a wholesale merchant, tried his hand at advertising, being a radio editor and also trying to establish himself as the director of a local office.

Nazi Seizure of Power in 1933 
1933 was a huge year for many soon-to-be SS and police officers.  As some historians have mentioned, for people like Streckenbach, 1933 was the year in which they assumed positions of the Gestapo (Political Police), but also the year which they were put into “leadership positions, posts they would hardly have occupied without the National Socialist seizure of power.” Following the Reichstag Fire on 27 February 1933 which the Nazis falsely propagated to be “communist-led,” there was a suspension of constitutional rights in the Weimar Republic, which increased the power of the government. Protests occurred and subsequently severe persecution towards left-wing politicians followed the Presidential Decree for the Protection of Volk and State on 28 February. In the March 5 Reichstag Elections, the National Socialists won power, although only upon merging with the Deutschnationale Volkspartei. After having the majority vote, the Nazi's seized full power. Persecution against political opponents and Jews increased, as did incidence of brutal assault, sporadic murder, and arson. It was during this seizure of power that many of the future leaders of the RSHA were given their first positions in the party.

More than a quarter of the future RSHA leaders had already been police officers in their respective home towns before 1933. In 1933, almost two-thirds of these men were given political police positions in their towns or cities, or sent to Berlin as a part of the Gestapo Office. Streckenbach himself only entered the police force on 31 August 1931 as the leader of the SS-Sturmbanner in Hamburg, Streckenbach's placement as chief of the Gestapo in Hamburg illustrates the “superficiality of professional continuity” – referring to the lack of qualifications many candidates possessed – as some historians characterize the Nazi Party's seizure of power.  For years, these young radical right-wing militants had been marginalized, but with the rise of the Nazis, they were now given the chance to pursue a career which preserved their radical and violent worldviews, and indeed encouraged such behaviour.  Historian Bradley Smith argues that the Nazi seizure of power offered these young men, including Bruno Streckenbach, a career which abided by and even enhanced their radicalism, and provided professional advancements which they had failed to receive in their careers up to this point.

In the invasion of Poland 
Reinhard Heydrich and Himmler were always trying to expand their power and authority beyond the confines of the German Reich. In accordance with Hitler's notion of Lebensraum, active persecution against Polish people, and long-term goals of “conquering extensive territories in the Soviet Union”, Hitler and other top Nazi leadership started preparing for a war, marked by the invasion of Poland. In preparation for the invasion of Poland, Heydrich expressed his ambition of having mobilized killing squads, a “fighting administration” as he put it.

The Einsatzgruppen were in charge of securing German power and occupational authority in Poland through terror, furthering the ideology of ethnic cleansing and Lebensraum via deportations out of the occupied territory and mass executions within. The number of Einsatzgruppen corresponded to the Wehrmacht army units deployed.  The leaders of the Sicherheitspolizei (SiPo; Security Police) in Berlin selected the office heads of the Einsatzgruppen very carefully, most of them being prior SD members or leaders. The members of the Einsatzgruppen— 500 men per Einsatzgruppe— were taken from local SS and police stations near the five units’ locations.

After the war, Bruno Streckenbach testified that Werner Best had directed deployment orders directly to him at the end of July or beginning of August. Streckenbach immediately left Hamburg to drive to Vienna, where he was deployed as head of Einsatzgruppe I. The German Wehrmacht invaded Poland on the morning of 1 September 1939. The Einsatzgruppen followed after them sending reports back to Berlin detailing the actions of Operation Tannenberg, the code name given to the anti-Polish extermination action carried out by the SD and SiPo in Poland during the opening weeks of the war. It was Streckenbach's task to oversee four districts as Befehlshaber der Sicherheitspolizei im General Gouvernement: Warsaw, Krakow, Radom and Lublin. In each of these districts, thousands of Polish intellectuals—many former officers, professors, teachers, or politicians—were arrested and soon after, murdered. Streckenbach detailed the mission of the Einsatzgruppen: they were to seize and destroy all political and racial enemy groups, such as leftists, Roma, Polish resistance and Jews. In addition, they were to report on and evaluate material seized during the campaign and to gather information from agents among the Soviet population. Streckenbach ordered all enemies of the Third Reich to be deported to concentration camps and there to be executed. Jews were especially singled out for Sonderbehandlung ("special treatment"), a process that entailed particularly brutal beatings. On 9 November 1941 he was promoted to SS-Gruppenführer und Generalleutnant der Polizei.

Einsatzgruppen 
By the end of 1939, the Einsatzgruppen were permanent units of the RSHA. Many members of the RSHA worked alongside the Einsatzgruppen in implementing brutal violence and mass murder throughout Poland. In May 1940, thousands of Poles were reported as liquidated. At the end of this month, Streckenbach had reported that “sentencing by martial law” was completed, with over 8,500 persons–whether accused as being “career criminals” or summoned to “summary sentencing”–were either already executed or would be shortly.

During his time in Poland, he had earned a reputation as the ruthless chief, who fought with such determination and mercilessness to eradicate any, and all, Nazi opponents.

Historian Michael Wildt suggests a stark increase in the activation of Streckenbach's radicalness from his time as a Gestapo chief in Hamburg to his first few months as the head of Einsatzgruppe I in Poland. Wildt notes the difference in responsibilities, going from arrests, abuses, assaults and killings of prisoners to the mindset of extermination of large groups of people. More than just a racial justification, Wildt suggests that Streckenbach's first few months as head of Einsatzgruppe I escalated into a murderous ideology that was unconceivable before this position.

Most of the previous SD men who were now employed in the Einsatzgruppen hadn't inflicted such murderous activity on so many people up until this point. As Wildt suggests, the deployment in Poland for the Einsatzgruppen was a defining moment for how policing matters were to be handled. It was these men's “first experience as racist mass murderers”. The deportations to the General-Gouvernement came from the Reich as well as newly “Germanized” territories which Germany had taken from Poland, removed the local “opponents”–Jews, Poles, Roma, and “asocial persons”–and replaced with ethnic Germans. During the late months of 1939, a span of eight weeks consisted of the execution of over 60,000 people by the Nazi forces, including by the Einsatzgruppen. Hitler insisted that this “harsh ethnic battle” could only be defeated without any internal resistance or legal restrictions upon implementation. Furthermore, the RSHA was the appropriate department for this “ethnic battle."

German offensive on the Soviet Union 
At the beginning of 1941, the attack on Soviet Union was first discussed among leaders of the RSHA. In March 1941, Heydrich informed a small circle of leaders, including Streckenbach, about the offensive that was to take place. The Wehrmacht army would lead and the Einsatzgruppen would secure the area after Soviets had been defeated. Streckenbach volunteered his unit's but Heydrich decided differently.

Streckenbach had commissioned the Personnel and Administration Office Leaders, advising them to prepare for deployment. In May 1941, Streckenbach called on his long-time colleague Erwin Schulz to prepare his men in the Leadership School of the Security Police in Berlin-Charlottenberg for deployment after just having completed their training as Criminal Police inspectors. Streckenbach sent them to Pretzsch, where they were to assume leadership status of the Einsatzkommando. These young soldiers, many of them recent college graduates, came motivated to fight and impress authority. The Einsatzgruppen were divided and formed in Pretzsch in May 1941. Streckenbach, Müller and Heydrich had the most authority in dispersing directions of the Einsatzkommandos in Pretzsch leading up to the offensive on the Soviet Union.  Furthermore, in Otto Ohlendorf's Nuremberg Trial, he testified that Bruno Streckenbach had communicated the “order for the Final Solution” to the Einsatzgruppen.

Heydrich's death impacts the RSHA 
Himmler and Hitler's actions following the assassination attempt and death of Heydrich were particularly vengeful. Hitler stated in reference to the Czechs who killed Heydrich, whenever you “kill someone, what results is always worse.” Streckenbach was called to Prague following the 4 June death of Heydrich. Himmler deemed the situation dire, the head of the RSHA having been killed with such abruptness.

Despite considering many leaders to assume Heydrich's position, Himmler decided to lead the RSHA himself. While Himmler was the head of the RSHA, Streckenbach — along with each of the other RSHA office heads — had near-full autonomy in deciding the internal structure of their respective divisions. Himmler focused his efforts on ensuring that Western European Jews be sent to extermination camps as efficiently and completely as possible, allowing the office heads like Streckenbach to control how it was done.

At the end of July 1942, Himmler named Streckenbach his representative as the legal authority of the RSHA. This essentially gave the latter absolute authority in deciding disciplinary cases regarding members of the RSHA. After Streckenbach had served as RSHA chief for about six months, Himmler concluded that a successor had to be publicly named. Bruno Streckenbach's responsibilities and qualifications were highly regarded and far exceeded expectations, and for this reason he was largely considered the best candidate for the position. Historian Tuviah Friedmann speculated that Himmler saw Streckenbach in some regards as having far too much power in his hands, possibly even seeing him as professional competition. To this day however, it is still unknown why Streckenbach was not appointed for the position of head of the RSHA, and Ernst Kaltenbrunner was chosen instead.

After the RSHA 
Hitler and Himmler wanted to name Streckenbach as the Senior SS and Police Leader of the Alpenland in Salzburg, Austria. Extremely disappointed, nonetheless, Streckenbach declined and in a personal letter to Himmler, requested to be placed in a military position.

Streckenbach trained in Hilversum, Holland with an antitank unit (as an Untersturmführer) in the beginning of 1943, and quickly advanced through the ranks of the Waffen-SS, even for being a senior SS leader. He was a regiment and division leader of the 8th SS Cavalry Division Florian Geyer and went on to lead the 19th Waffen Grenadier Division of the SS (2nd Latvian) in the offensive against the Soviet Union in 1944 as a general. On 10 May 1945, Streckenbach and his division were taken prisoner in the Courland Pocket by the Soviet army. He remained a Soviet prisoner of war until 9 October 1955, when he was sent back to Hamburg.

Legal prosecution 
When Streckenbach returned to Hamburg, he was informed that he faced charges for actions he had taken as the city's Gestapo chief. He was accused of beating someone in the kidneys; however after further investigation, the state prosecutor could not obtain the appropriate documents which provided evidence of the charges.

During the Nuremberg Trials, Streckenbach's name was continuously mentioned in court papers, among which was a testimony from Otto Ohlendorf who, as mentioned before, identified Streckenbach as one who had directed the Einsatzgruppen towards implementation of the Final Solution. However, the Hamburg State Prosecutor's Office concluded that there was not sufficient evidence to prove that his actions conflicted with the extant governing laws of the National Socialist rule.  It was the case that many inhumane acts taken by the former Nazi members; as Wildt says, the assumption that National Socialism was synonymous with the “German Dictatorship rendered indivisible” the murderous acts that the party had taken in eastern and southern Europe and the Soviet Union.

In 1957, state prosecutors in Germany began discovering the unfathomable atrocities and millions of deaths of Soviet Jews culminating in the Ulm Einsatzkommando trial.  His case prompted the 1959 establishment of the Central Office of State Justice Administration for the Investigation of National Socialist Crimes (Zentrale Stelle der Landesjustizverwaltungen zur Aufklärung der nationalsozialistischen Gewaltverbrechen) in Ludwigsburg. In the early 1960s, the office discovered a document providing evidence of deployment orders to Criminal Police and Gestapo officers that incited murderous activity. The court ordered the resumption of the investigation of crimes committed by Bruno Streckenbach.

On 30 June 1973, a bill of indictment for the murder of at least a million people was brought.  Streckenbach, who was suffering from serious heart disease at the time, claimed ineligibility notwithstanding the strains a trial might place on his health.  On 20 September 1974, the Hanseatic Appellate Court confirmed a diagnosis postponing trial commencement indefinitely.  Bruno Streckenbach never had to answer for his part in the Nazi regime.  He died on 28 October 1977 in Hamburg, Germany.

Awards

Iron Cross (1939) 2nd Class (10 October 1940) & 1st Class (15 July 1943)
German Cross in Gold on 15 December 1943 as SS-Standartenführer in the SS-Kavallerie-Division
Knight's Cross of the Iron Cross with Oak Leaves
Knight's Cross on 27 August 1944 as commander of the 19. Waffen-Grenadier Division der Waffen-SS (lett. Nr. 2).
Oak Leaves on 16 January 1945 as commander of the 19. Waffen-Grenadier Division der Waffen-SS (lett. Nr. 2).

See also
List SS-Gruppenführer

References

Citations

Bibliography

 
 
 
 

1902 births
1977 deaths
Military personnel from Hamburg
Nazi Party politicians
Recipients of the Gold German Cross
Recipients of the Knight's Cross of the Iron Cross with Oak Leaves
SS-Gruppenführer
Einsatzgruppen personnel
Holocaust perpetrators in Poland
Reich Security Main Office personnel
Waffen-SS personnel
Gestapo personnel
20th-century Freikorps personnel
German Army personnel of World War I
Kapp Putsch participants
German prisoners of war in World War II held by the Soviet Union